The 1957 Small Club World Cup (officially, "Copa República de Venezuela") was the sixth edition of the Small Club World Cup, a tournament held in Venezuela between 1952 and 1957, and in 1963 and in 1965. It was played by four participants, half from Europe and half from South America in double round robin format, and featured star players like Didi and Garrincha for Botafogo, Uruguayan Ramón Villaverde who reappeared after the 1953 edition, goalkeeper Antoni Ramallets, Estanislau Basora, and Brazilian Evaristo for Barcelona, goalkeeper Roberto Sosa, Héctor Núñez, and Guillermo Escalada for Nacional de Montevideo, and Marcelino Campanal for Sevilla. Also, future Real Madrid defender José Santamaría was in Nacional's squad.

This was the last edition of the championship with its original name and degree of importance. After the creation of the European Champions Cup, the efforts of European clubs were all to dispute the then fledgling Cup, emptying the Venezuelan tournament. Real Madrid, European champions in 1955–56, participated in the 1956 competition; but after retaining their European title in 1956–57, Real Madrid did not attend the 1957 edition of the Venezuelan tournament, which ended up being the last tournament in this original series. Other invited teams that did not contest the competition were Lazio, Atlético Madrid, Athletic Bilbao, and Fluminense.

Spanish team Barcelona won the competition, achieving their first title, with Uruguayan forward Ramón Villaverde being the topscorer with 6 goals. Other editions would happen without regularity, named Trophy City of Caracas, from 1963, but without the same quality of the participants.

Participants

Matches

Final standing

Topscorers

Champion

References

1956–57
1957 in South American football
1957 in Brazilian football
1957 in Uruguayan football
1957–58 in Spanish football
1957 in Venezuelan sport